The 2013–14 Sam Houston State Bearkats women's basketball team represented Sam Houston State University during the 2013–14 NCAA Division I women's basketball season. The Bearkats, led by seventh year head coach Brenda Welch-Nichols, played their home games at the Bernard Johnson Coliseum and are members of the Southland Conference.

Roster

Schedule

|-
!colspan=9| Exhibition

|-
!colspan=9| Regular Season

See also
2013–14 Sam Houston State Bearkats men's basketball team

References

Sam Houston Bearkats women's basketball seasons
Sam Houston State
Sam Houston State Bearkats basketball
Sam Houston State Bearkats basketball